Goodallia is a monotypic genus of flowering plants belonging to the family Thymelaeaceae. It just contains one species, Goodallia guianensis Benth. 

Its native range is Guyana.

The genus name of Goodallia is in honour of Edward Angelo Goodall (1819–1908), an English painter and illustrator. The Latin specific epithet of guianensis means "of the Guianas" (an area of north eastern South America).
It was first described and published by George Bentham in London J. Bot. Vol.4 on page 633 in 1845.

References

Thymelaeaceae
Malvales genera
Plants described in 1845
Flora of Guyana